The Maihue Lake (Mapudungun for Wooden glass) is a lake located east of Ranco Lake in the Andean mountains of southern Chile. The lake is of glacial origin and it is enclosed by mountain ranges of the Andes, by all sides, and drains west to Ranco Lake.

References 

Lakes of Chile
Lakes of Los Ríos Region
Mapuche language